Kisela Voda (meaning "mineral water") is one of the ten municipalities that make up the city of Skopje, the capital of North Macedonia.

Geography
The municipality borders Karpoš Municipality to the northwest, Centar Municipality to the north, Aerodrom Municipality to the northeast, Studeničani Municipality to the south, and Sopište Municipality to the west.

Demographics

According to the last national census from 2002, this municipality has 125,379 inhabitants, including parts that were later moved to Aerodrom. Ethnic groups in the municipality include:
Macedonians = 52,478 (91.7%)
Serbs = 1,426 (2.5%)
Romas = 716 (1.3%)
others.

Schools
Krume Kepeski
Kiril Pejcinovic
Kuzman Josifovski Pitu
Partenij Zografski
High school Vasil Antevski Dren
Nevena Georgieva Dunja

Twin Municipalities  

Bahçelievler, Istanbul 
Zvezdara, Belgrade

References

External links
 Official website

 
Municipalities of North Macedonia
Municipalities of Skopje